Ronald Gordon Honeycombe (27 September 1936 – 9 October 2015), known professionally as Gordon Honeycombe, was a British  newscaster, author, playwright and stage actor.

Honeycombe was born in Karachi, in the British Raj. He was educated at the Edinburgh Academy and read English at University College, Oxford. He completed National Service with the Royal Artillery, mainly in Hong Kong, where he was also an announcer with Radio Hong Kong. Returning to the UK, he embarked on an acting career which led to television and public prominence as a national newscaster with ITN.

He later settled in Perth, Western Australia, where he continued to work in radio, television and theatre, and was regularly engaged in voice-over work for radio and television, and in documentary narrations.

Career highlights
Honeycombe joined the Royal Shakespeare Company, working from 1962 to 1964 as an actor at Stratford-upon-Avon and at the Aldwych Theatre, London. From 1965 to 1977 at ITN, he became nationally known as a newscaster. He was twice voted the most popular newscaster in Britain, by readers of the Daily Mirror and of The Sun. From 1977 to 1984, he concentrated on writing, while continuing many other activities, such as presenting television shows for Scottish Television, Southern Television and for the BBC. He returned to regular newsreading from 1984 to 1989 as chief newsreader at TV-am. He was voted the most popular male TV newscaster by readers of Woman's Own magazine in 1986, and received the Television and Radio Industries Club Newscaster of the Year Award in 1989.
While appearing on British television, he also recorded voice-overs or narrations of many television and other documentaries, training films, commercials and cinema shorts, and was involved in many industrial presentations, conferences, in-house videos and fund-raising charity events.

He produced and directed his own play The Redemption for the Festival of Perth in Western Australia, in March 1990, and settled in that area.

Appearances
Beside the appearances listed below, Honeycombe also presented, appeared in and narrated many television programmes and appeared in many television plays and series. He has also sung at major fund-raising events for various charities.

Film
Blood of the Vampire (1958) - Stretcher Bearer (uncredited)
Ransom (1974) - newsreader (uncredited)
The Medusa Touch (1978) - TV Newscaster
Castaway (1986) - TV Newscaster
The Fourth Protocol (1987) - Television Announcer
Bullseye! (1990) - TV Announcer
Let's Get Skase (2001) - Murray Bishop
The Sculptor (2008) - Gordon
Then She Was Gone (2010) - Seymour (final film role)

British stage
The Physicists in 1963. Aldwych Theatre 
 Suspects, in 1989 at Swansea
 Run for Your Wife, in 1990 touring with Les Dawson
 Aladdin in 1989–90 at the Wimbledon Theatre, with Cilla Black
 Aladdin in 1990–91 at the Pavilion Theatre, Bournemouth, with Su Pollard.

Australian stage
 The Taming of the Shrew

Works
From 1965, as well as his own books, Honeycombe wrote for television, radio, stage and films. One of his best-known books is the horror novel Neither the Sea Nor the Sand. Early in his career, Honeycombe wrote two horror novels, described by horror historian Stefan R Dziemianowicz as  "atmospheric modern gothics whose rugged natural northern English settings resonate with their unsparing supernatural horrors." The first of these, Neither the Sea Nor the Sand, tells the story of a woman whose dead lover returns to life. It was followed by Dragon Under the Hill, where a history professor in Northumberland finds himself re-enacting a tragedy that took place in the Viking era. Dziemianowicz noted that since Honeycombe's books were published before the horror boom of the 1970s, they
have been "greatly overlooked as a result".

Fiction books
 Neither the Sea Nor the Sand (1969)
 Dragon Under the Hill (1972)
 The Edge of Heaven (1981)

Non-fiction books
 Adam's Tale (1974)
 Red Watch (1976)
 Royal Wedding (1981)
 Nagasaki 1945 (1981)
 The Murders of the Black Museum (1982)
 The Year of the Princess (1982)
 Selfridges (1984)
 The TV-AM Celebration of the Royal Wedding (1986)
 More Murders of the Black Museum (1995)
 The Complete Murders of the Black Museum (1995)
 Siren Song (1992)

Stage and radio dramatisations
 The Redemption
 Lancelot and Guinevere
 Paradise Lost

Television plays
 The Golden Vision (BBC1, 1968),
 Time and Again (Westward Television, 1974)
 The Professionals: Weekend in the Country (TV Series), 1980)
 The Thirteenth Day of Christmas (Granada Television, 1985)

Musical adaptation
 The Princess and the Goblins'' (both book and lyrics: staged in 1994)

Private life
Honeycombe was a freemason under the United Grand Lodge of England, initiated in 1959 in the Apollo University Lodge No 357 (Oxford).

He had a great interest in his family history, carrying out research as well as organising extended family gatherings. Nonetheless, he did not marry, and had no children.

Notes

References

External links
Gordon Honeycombe's web site
 
Brief reviews of books by Gordon Honeycombe

1936 births
2015 deaths
People from Karachi
British male stage actors
20th-century British historians
British non-fiction crime writers
20th-century British novelists
British dramatists and playwrights
British television writers
British television presenters
ITN newsreaders and journalists
People educated at Edinburgh Academy
Alumni of University College, Oxford
English horror writers
British male screenwriters
English male dramatists and playwrights
British male television writers
British male novelists